This article lists historical events that occurred between 301–400 in modern-day Lebanon or regarding its people.

Administration

Diocletian (r. 284–305) separated the district of Batanaea and gave it to Arabia, while sometime before 328, when it is mentioned in the Laterculus Veronensis, Constantine the Great (r. 306–337) created the new province of Augusta Libanensis out of the eastern half of the old province of Phoenice, encompassing the territory east of Mount Lebanon.

Governors
In the fourth century, as a whole, almost 30 governors of Phoenicia are known with 23 governors of Phoenicia being in office between 353 and 394. Amongst them was Sossianus Hierocles, who was a praeses at some time between 293 and 303. The Prosopography of the Later Roman Empire (PLRE) states that, as praeses, he governed Phoenice Libanensis, the province on the eastern side of Mount Lebanon. The district included Palmyra, where the inscription attesting to Hierocles' career is located.

Consularis Governors of Phoenicia

Events

300s

The Edict on Maximum Prices is issued by the emperor Diocletian in 301 AD, with the prices and simulated sailing times from Nicomedia to Beirut reported to be 12 denarii for 9.9 days of duration with the ratio (price/duration) being 0.83.
Beginning of the Diocletianic Persecutions, 303 AD.
Five young Christians are martyred at Tyre in 303.
Ulphianus, a Tyrian youth, is martyred, 303 AD.
500 Christians in Tyre get tortured and martyred in 304 AD.
Aphian, a student of the Law school of Berytus, is martyred on April 2 .
Constantine is emperor on 25 July 306.
The Governor Urbanus, shortly after Easter 307, orders the virgin Theodosia of Tyre to be thrown to the sea for conversing with Christians attending trial and refusing sacrifice.

Maximus is consularis (governor) of Phoenice, .
Pamphilus of Caesarea, a biblical scholar from a rich and honorable family of Beirut, is martyred in February 16, 309.

310s
Tyrannion of Tyre is martyred during the Diocletianic Persecutions, 311 AD.

 Maximinus issues a rescript encouraging every city to expel its Christians. This rescript is published in Tyre on May or June, 312 AD.
 Emperor Constantine converts to Christianity in 312 AD.
 The Edict of Milan, is issued in February of 313 AD.
 In 315 AD, the cathedral of Paulinus in Tyre is inaugurated by the Bishop Eusebius, who recorded his speech and thus a detailed account of the site in his writings.

In 316, the Tyrian-born Frumentius and his brother, Edesius accompanied their uncle Metropius on a trip to the Kingdom of Axum by ship, the crew was massacred in a port on the Red Sea and the boys taken as slaves to the King of Axum. Frumentius and Edesius, who were both christian, gained favor with the king and his family, signaling the birth of Christianity in Ethiopia.

320s
Achillius is consularis of Phoenice .

During the reign of Emperor Constantine, his mother, Helena of Constantinople, requests in 324  the destruction of all pagan temples and idols dedicated to Astarte.  The Astarte shrine in Maghdouché was probably destroyed at that time and converted to a place of devotion to Mary.
Paulinus of Tyre is the Patriarch of Antioch and all the East for about six months in 324 and 325.
The First Council of Nicaea – in which ten bishops from Phoenicia attended (one of them being Zeno I, bishop of Tyre) – is convened in 325 AD.

Christian Maronite saint Awtel dies in 327 AD.
Fl. Dionysius serves as the governor of Phoenicia in 328–329.

330s

Archelaus is consularis of Phoenice 335 AD.
The First Synod of Tyre or the Council of Tyre (335 AD), a gathering of bishops, in which the first historically documented bishop of Tripoli, Hellanicus, took part, for the primary purpose of evaluating charges brought against Athanasius, the Patriarch of Alexandria, is called together by Emperor Constantine.
Emperor Constantine is baptized by the once-bishop of Beirut, Eusebius of Nicomedia, right before his death on 22 May 337.
Nonnus is consularis of Phoenice .

340s
Marcellinus, is attested as praeses of Phoenice in 342 AD.

350s
Apollinaris is consularis of Phoenice, 353/4.
The Letter 492 of Rhetorician Libanius to Vindonius Anatolius of Beirut is written in 356, in the letter, Libanius writes that Anatolius, a native of Phoenicia, had spent some time “among us”, (i.e. in Antioch).
In about 356, the Emperor Constantius II writes to Axumite King Ezana and his brother Saizana, requesting them to replace Frumentius as bishop with Theophilos the Indian, who supported the Arian position, as did the emperor. The king refused the request.
Nicentius is consularis of Phoenice 358 – 359
Euchrostius is consularis of Phoenice 359/60

360s
In 360, Dominus the Elder, a law school professor, declines the invitation of Libanius to leave the Law School at Beirut and to teach with him at the rhetoric school of Antioch.
Andronicus is consularis of Phoenice, 360 – 361.
Anatolius is consularis of Phoenice, 361 AD.
Polycles is consularis of Phoenice, .
Julianus is consularis of Phoenice, 362 AD.

Around 362 AD, Julian the Apostate burns a basilica that existed in Beirut.
The 107-year-old Dorotheus of Tyre, bishop of Tyre, is martyred in 362 AD.
Gaianus of Tyre is the consular governor of Phoenicia in 362.
Marius is consularis of Phoenice, 363 – 364.
Ulpianus is consularis of Phoenice, 364.
Domninus is consularis of Phoenice, 364 – 365.
In 365 AD, Tyre and Sidon alongside several other coastal cities are damaged by a tsunami caused by the Crete earthquake.

370s 
Leontius is consularis of Phoenice, 372 AD.

The Temple of Jupiter at Baalbek, already greatly damaged by earthquakes, is demolished under Theodosius in 379 and replaced by another basilica (now lost), using stones scavenged from the pagan complex.

380s
 Petrus is consularis of Phoenice, 380 AD.
 The Edict of Thessalonica is issued on 27 February AD 380, making Christianity the sole official religion of the Roman empire.
 Diodorus is bishop of Tyre, 381 AD.
 Proculus is consularis of Phoenice, 382 – 383.
 Frumentius dies .

 Proculus, governor of Phoenicia, is Comes Orientis between 383 and 384.  During this time, his name was carved on the Commemorative stela of Nahr el-Kalb.
Antherius and Epiphanius are cōnsulārēs of Phoenice, 388 AD.

390s
Domitius is consularis of Phoenice, 390.
Severianus is consularis of Phoenice, 391.
Leontius is consularis of Phoenice, 392.

Education
In the 4th century, the Greek rhetorician Libanius reported that the school attracted young students from affluent families and deplored the school's instructional use of Latin, which was gradually abandoned in favor of Greek in the course of the century.

Historically, Roman stationes or auditoria, where teaching was done, stood next to public libraries housed in temples. This arrangement was copied in the Roman colony at Beirut. The first mention of the school's premises dates to 350.

Professors

Architecture 
Shrine of Our Lady of Nourieh.
Our Lady of Awaiting, Maghdouché.
A basilica in Tyre built upon the ruins of a church by the city's bishop, Paulinus.

References

Sources 
 Linda Jones Hall, Roman Berytus: Beirut in late antiquity (2004)

Simmons, Michael Bland. "Graeco-Roman Philosophical Opposition". In The Early Christian World, edited by Philip Francis Esler, 2.840–868. New York: Routledge, 2000.

4th century BC by country